Nine O'Clock is a Romanian English-language newspaper.

The newspaper consists mainly of sections related to politics, business, sports, culture, Romania-related news and weather.

External links
  

1991 establishments in Romania
Publications established in 1991
English-language newspapers published in Romania
Newspapers published in Bucharest
Mass media in Romania